Pictichromis porphyrea, the magenta dottyback, is a fish in the dottyback family from the western Pacific. It can be found from the Philippines to Samoa, extending north to the Ryukyu Islands and south to the Moluccas and Admiralty Islands. It occasionally makes its way into the aquarium trade.

References

External links
 

porphyrea
Fish described in 1974